September 23 - Eastern Orthodox liturgical calendar - September 25

All fixed commemorations below celebrated on October 7 by Orthodox Churches on the Old Calendar.

For September 24th, Orthodox Churches on the Old Calendar commemorate the Saints listed on September 11.

Saints
 Protomartyr and Equal-to-the-Apostles Thekla of Iconium (1st century)
 Saint Persa (Persis, Persida).
 Venerable Coprius of Palestine, monk (530)

Pre-Schism Western saints
 Saint Anathalon (Anatolius), fhe first Bishop of Milan (1st century)
 Saints Andochius, Thyrsus and Felix, marytrs in Gaul (2nd century)
 Saint Rusticus, Bishop of Clermont in Auvergne in France (446)
 Saint Geremarus (Germer), founder of Saint-Germer-de-Fly Abbey (c. 658)
 Saints Chuniald and Gislar, born in Ireland, they enlightened the south of Germany and Austria with St Rupert of Salzburg (7th century)
 Saint Gerard Sagredo (Gerard of Csanád), Apostle of Hungary (1046)
 Saint Isarnus of Marseilles, Abbot (1048)

Post-Schism Orthodox saints
 Saint Abramius, first Abbot of Mirozh Monastery in Pskov (1158)
 Saints Stephen the First-Crowned (in monasticism Simon) (1224), David (13th century), and Stephen Vladislav (after 1264), of Serbia.
 Venerable Nicander, hermit of Pskov (1581)
 Monk-martyr Galacteon of Vologda (1612)
 Venerable New Hiero-confessor Leontius (Karpovich), Archimandrite, of Vilnius (1620)
 Saint Theodosius, Abbot, of Manyava Skete, Ukraine (1629)
 Venerable Dorothea, Schema-Nun of Kashin (1629)
 Hieromartyr Juvenaly of Alaska (1796)<ref>Martyr Juvenal of Alaska. OCA - Lives of the Saints.</ref>
 New Martyr of Alaska, Peter (Cungagnaq) the Aleut, at the hands of Roman Catholics in San Francisco (1815)Martyr Peter the Aleut. OCA - Lives of the Saints.  (see also: December 13 - Synaxis of the First Martyrs of the American land.)
 Venerable Gabriel of Seven Lakes Monastery in Kazan, and of Pskov-Eleazar Monastery in Pskov, Schema-Archimandrite (1915)
 Venerable Silouan, Elder of St. Panteleimon Monastery, Mount Athos (1938)Great Synaxaristes:  Ὁ Ἅγιος Σιλουανὸς ὁ Ἁγιορείτης. 24 Σεπτεμβρίου. ΜΕΓΑΣ ΣΥΝΑΞΑΡΙΣΤΗΣ. (see also: September 11 )

New martyrs and confessors
 New Hieromartyr Basil Voskresensky, Deacon (1918)
 New Hieromartyrs Andrew Bistrov and Paul Berezin, Priests (1937)
 New Hieromartyr Vitaly (Kokorev) (1937)
 Martyrs Basil Vinogradov, Sergius Mikhailov and Spiridon Saveliev (1937)
 New Hieromartyr Nicander Grivsky, Priest (1939)

Other commemorations
 Icon of the Most Holy Theotokos "Of Mirozh" (1198)Icon of the Mother of God "Mirozh". OCA - Lives of the Saints.
 Icon of the Most Holy Theotokos "Filerimos" in Rhodes (10th century)
 Icon of the Most Holy Theotokos "Of the Myrtle Tree" / "Myrtidiotissa" of Kythera (14th century)Great Synaxaristes:  Μνήμη Θαύματος τῆς Θεοτόκου καὶ Ἀειπαρθένου Μαρίας τῆς Μυρτιδιωτίσσης. 24 Σεπτεμβρίου. ΜΕΓΑΣ ΣΥΝΑΞΑΡΙΣΤΗΣ.Icon of the Mother of God of “The Myrtle Tree”. OCA - Lives of the Saints.
 Synaxis of All Saints of Alaska - Arrival in America of the first Orthodox Mission (1794):  (see also: December 13 - Synaxis of the First Martyrs of the American land.)
 Saints Herman, Juvenaly, and others.

Icon gallery

Notes

References

Sources
 September 24/October 7. Orthodox Calendar (PRAVOSLAVIE.RU).
 October 7 / September 24. HOLY TRINITY RUSSIAN ORTHODOX CHURCH (A parish of the Patriarchate of Moscow).
 September 24. OCA - The Lives of the Saints.
 The Autonomous Orthodox Metropolia of Western Europe and the Americas (ROCOR). St. Hilarion Calendar of Saints for the year of our Lord 2004. St. Hilarion Press (Austin, TX). p. 71.
 The Twenty-Fourth Day of the Month of September. Orthodoxy in China.
 September 24. Latin Saints of the Orthodox Patriarchate of Rome.
 The Roman Martyrology. Transl. by the Archbishop of Baltimore. Last Edition, According to the Copy Printed at Rome in 1914. Revised Edition, with the Imprimatur of His Eminence Cardinal Gibbons. Baltimore: John Murphy Company, 1916. pp. 295–296.
 Rev. Richard Stanton. A Menology of England and Wales, or, Brief Memorials of the Ancient British and English Saints Arranged According to the Calendar, Together with the Martyrs of the 16th and 17th Centuries. London: Burns & Oates, 1892. pp. 456–457.
Greek Sources
 Great Synaxaristes:  24 ΣΕΠΤΕΜΒΡΙΟΥ. ΜΕΓΑΣ ΣΥΝΑΞΑΡΙΣΤΗΣ.
  Συναξαριστής. 24 Σεπτεμβρίου. ECCLESIA.GR. (H ΕΚΚΛΗΣΙΑ ΤΗΣ ΕΛΛΑΔΟΣ).
  24/09/2016.'' Ορθόδοξος Συναξαριστής.
Russian Sources
  7 октября (24 сентября). Православная Энциклопедия под редакцией Патриарха Московского и всея Руси Кирилла (электронная версия). (Orthodox Encyclopedia - Pravenc.ru).
  24 сентября по старому стилю / 7 октября по новому стилю. Русская Православная Церковь - Православный церковный календарь на 2016 год.

September in the Eastern Orthodox calendar